Marc Anthony Newsham (born 24 March 1987) is an English footballer who plays as a striker for Sheffield.

He notably played in the Football League for Rotherham United, but has since played in Non-League football for Gainsborough Trinity, Ilkeston Town, Boston United and Matlock Town.

Career
Newsham is a product of the Rotherham United youth team and made his first team debut in March 2005. He scored his first goal for the club against Accrington Stanley in the Football League Trophy in October 2005 to take the tie to penalties. Following the 2007–08 season, he signed a new one-year contract with Rotherham in May 2008.

Newsham signed on a month's loan for Gainsborough Trinity in November 2008, but failed to make an impact in the first team, mainly due to the signing of Luke Beckett. He also spent time on loan with Ilkeston Town helping the club earn a play-off spot in the Northern Premier Division. Newsham was released by Rotherham on his return and signed for Boston United in June 2009. From joining Boston in 2009, Newsham scored over 100 goals for the Lincolnshire club.

On 11 June 2015, Newsham left Boston United to join local rivals Gainsborough Trinity on a permanent deal. The transfer gained some attention after it was noted that the scarf Newsham was holding in his signing picture had misspelled the club's name. He scored his first competitive goal for Trinity against the Pilgrims in an FA Cup 2nd Qualifying Round tie.

He joined Matlock Town in May 2016.

References

External links

1987 births
Living people
Footballers from Doncaster
English footballers
Association football forwards
Rotherham United F.C. players
Sheffield F.C. players
Gainsborough Trinity F.C. players
Ilkeston Town F.C. (1945) players
Boston United F.C. players
Matlock Town F.C. players
English Football League players
Universiade silver medalists for Great Britain
Universiade medalists in football
Medalists at the 2013 Summer Universiade